Claire Trevor ( Wemlinger; March 8, 1910April 8, 2000) was an American actress. She appeared in 65 feature films from 1933 to 1982, winning the Academy Award for Best Supporting Actress for her role in Key Largo (1948), and received nominations for her roles in The High and the Mighty (1954) and Dead End (1937). Trevor received top billing, ahead of John Wayne, for Stagecoach (1939).

Early life
Trevor was born on March 8, 1910, in Bensonhurst, Brooklyn, New York City, the only child of Noel Wemlinger, a Fifth Avenue merchant tailor (of French birth but German ancestry), and his wife, Benjamina ("Betty"), who was of Irish birth. She was raised in New York City, and from 1923 on, in Larchmont, New York. For many years, her year of birth was misreported as 1909, which is why her age at the time of her death was initially given as 91, not 90.

Career

According to her biography on the website of Claire Trevor School of the Arts, "Trevor's acting career spanned more than seven decades and included successes in stage, radio, television, and film...[She] often played the hard-boiled blonde, and every conceivable type of 'bad girl' role."

After completing high school, Trevor began her career with six months of art classes at Columbia University and six months at the American Academy of Dramatic Arts. She made her stage debut in the summer of 1929 with a repertory company in Ann Arbor, Michigan. She subsequently returned to New York, where she appeared in a number of Brooklyn-filmed Vitaphone short films and performed in summer stock theatre. In 1932, she starred on Broadway as the female lead in Whistling in the Dark.

Trevor made her film debut in Jimmy and Sally (1933), a film originally written for the popular screen duo of James Dunn and Sally Eilers. When Eilers declined the role, Trevor was cast in her place. From 1933 to 1938, Trevor starred in 29 films, often having either the lead role or the role of heroine. In 1937, she was the second lead actress (after top-billed Sylvia Sidney) in Dead End, with Humphrey Bogart, which led to her nomination for Best Supporting Actress. From 1937 to 1940, she appeared with Edward G. Robinson in the popular radio series Big Town, while continuing to make movies. In the early 1940s, she also was a regular on The Old Gold Don Ameche Show on the NBC Red Radio Network, starring with Ameche in presentations of plays by Mark Hellinger. In 1939, she was well established as a solid leading lady. One of her more memorable performances during this period includes the Western Stagecoach (1939).

Two of Trevor's most memorable roles were opposite Dick Powell in Murder, My Sweet (1944) and with Lawrence Tierney in Born to Kill (1947). In Key Largo (1948), Trevor played Gaye Dawn, a washed-up, alcoholic nightclub singer and gangster's moll. For that role, she won the Academy Award for Best Supporting Actress. Her third and final Oscar nomination was for her performance in The High and the Mighty (1954). In 1957, she won an Emmy for her role in the Producers' Showcase episode entitled "Dodsworth". Trevor moved into supporting roles in the 1950s, with her appearances becoming very rare after the mid-1960s. She played Charlotte, the mother of Kay (Sally Field) in Kiss Me Goodbye (1982). Her final television role was for the 1987 television film, Norman Rockwell's Breaking Home Ties. Trevor made a guest appearance at the 70th Academy Awards in 1998.

Personal life and death
Trevor married Clark Andrews, director of her radio show, in 1938; they divorced four years later. She married Navy Lieutenant Cylos William Dunsmore in 1943. Their son Charles was  her only child. The couple divorced in 1947. The next year, Trevor married Milton Bren, a film producer with two sons from a previous marriage, and moved to Newport Beach, California.

In 1978, Trevor's son, Charles, died in the crash of PSA Flight 182, and this was followed by the death of her husband Milton from a brain tumor in 1979. Devastated by these losses, she returned to Manhattan for some years, living in a Fifth Avenue apartment and taking a few acting roles amid a busy social life. She eventually returned to California, where she remained for the rest of her life, becoming a generous supporter of the arts.

Trevor supported Thomas Dewey in the 1944 United States presidential election.

On April 8, 2000, Trevor died  at a hospital in Newport Beach, California. For her contribution to the motion picture industry, she has a star on the Hollywood Walk of Fame at 6933 Hollywood Boulevard.

Legacy
The Claire Trevor School of the Arts at the University of California, Irvine, was named in Trevor's honor. Her Oscar and Emmy statuettes are on display in the Arts Plaza, next to the Claire Trevor Theatre.

Filmography

Radio appearances

References

Further reading

External links

 
 
 https://mcfarlandbooks.com/product/claire-trevor/
 Claire Trevor School of the Arts
 Photos of Claire Trevor in 'Stagecoach' by Ned Scott
 Photographs of Claire Trevor
 Guide to the Claire Trevor Memorabilia. Special Collections and Archives, The UC Irvine Libraries, Irvine, California.
 Claire Trevor and her young son Charles (photo)

1910 births
2000 deaths
20th-century American actresses
Actresses from New York (state)
American film actresses
American people of French descent
American people of German descent
American people of Irish descent
American stage actresses
American television actresses
Best Supporting Actress Academy Award winners
Columbia University alumni
Deaths from respiratory failure
Outstanding Performance by a Lead Actress in a Miniseries or Movie Primetime Emmy Award winners
People from Bensonhurst, Brooklyn
People from Larchmont, New York
Western (genre) film actresses